The Aschiagar (Aşyağar) is a river of Mangystau Region of Kazakhstan, and runs some  to the east of the city of Aktau.

The source of the Aschiagara is located on the southern slopes of  Karatau, north of the town of Kuryk.

The river freezes in mid-December and begins to thaw in early March.

Rivers of Kazakhstan
Mangystau Region